Collin River is a tributary of the North Shore of the Mégiscane River, flowing into Senneterre, in La Vallée-de-l'Or Regional County Municipality, in the administrative region of Abitibi-Témiscamingue, Quebec, Canada.

The course of the river crosses successively the townships of Boisseau and Jurie.

The Collin River flows entirely in forest territory, generally towards the South crossing five bodies of water. Forestry is the main economic activity of this watershed. Road R0806 (Penetration Road) cuts from east to west the lower Collin River; secondary and forest roads serve the entire hydrographic slope. The surface of the river is usually frozen from mid-December to mid-April.

Geography

Toponymy
The toponym "Collin River" was formalized on December 5, 1968, at the Commission de toponymie du Québec.

See also

References

External links 

Jamésie
La Vallée-de-l’Or
Rivers of Abitibi-Témiscamingue
Nottaway River drainage basin